Cape Eva is a cape forming the north end of Peter I Island. It was discovered and named in 1927 by a Norwegian expedition in the Odd I under Eyvind Tofte.

See also
Tvistein Pillars

References
 

Headlands of Antarctica
Peter I Island